Gageo Reef (Korean: 가거초/Gageocho) or Rixiang Reef is an uninhabited submerged rock 7.8 metres below sea level (at low tide) located in the Yellow Sea.

History
The Japanese battleship Hyūga (日向) hit this undersea rock on March 29, 1927. Japanese navy then researched the surrounding area and found the rock and named it as Hyūga shou, meaning Hyuga reef, after the ship. Chinese name Rìxiàng Jiāo, meaning Rixiang reef, is the Chinese pronunciation of its Japanese name.
On December 19, 2007, Korean side changed the name to Gageo Reef, named after the nearby island.
As of 2012, there is a Korean marine research station located at the reef.

Dispute
According to the United Nations Convention on the Law of the Sea, a submerged reef can not be claimed as territory by any country. However, China and South Korea dispute which is entitled to claim it as part of the Exclusive Economic Zone (EEZ).

See also
Socotra Rock

References

Disputed waters
Reefs of China
Landforms of South Korea
Reefs of the Pacific Ocean
Landforms of South Jeolla Province
Sinan County, South Jeolla